Gabrielle-Charlotte Patin (1666 in Paris, France – 1751 in Padua, Italy) was a French numismatist, writer and painter during the 17th century.

She was the granddaughter of medical doctor and letter writer Guy Patin, daughter of medical doctor and numismatist Charles Patin and moralist writer Madeleine Patin, as well as sister of the writer and art critic Charlotte-Catherine Patin. Gabrielle-Charlotte Patin published a Latin work on Phoenician numismatics: De Phœnice in numismate imperatoris Caracallæ expressa epistola (Venise, 1683, in-4°).

Gabrielle-Charlotte Patin was made, as were her sister and parents, a member of the Galileiana Academy of Arts and Science under the name "Diserte". At this academy, she gave the panegyric lecture on Louis XIV in 1685.

See also

Numismatics
17th-century French literature

References

1666 births
1751 deaths
17th-century French painters
18th-century French painters
17th-century French writers
17th-century French women writers
18th-century French writers
18th-century French women writers
French numismatists
Women numismatists
French women painters